The 1991 Volvo Tennis/Los Angeles was a men's tennis tournament held on outdoor hardcourts at the Los Angeles Tennis Center in Los Angeles, California in the United States that was part of the World Series category of the 1991 ATP Tour. It was the 65th edition of the tournament and was held from July 29, 1991 through August 4, 1991. Second-seeded Pete Sampras won the singles title.

Finals

Singles

 Pete Sampras defeated  Brad Gilbert 6–2, 6–7(5–7), 6–3
 It was Sampras' 1st singles title of the year and the 5th of his career.

Doubles

 Javier Frana /  Jim Pugh defeated  Glenn Michibata /  Brad Pearce 7–5, 2–6, 6–4

See also
 1991 Virginia Slims of Los Angeles – women's tournament

References

External links
 ITF tournament edition details

Volvo Tennis/Los Angeles
Los Angeles Open (tennis)
Volvo Tennis/Los Angeles
Volvo Tennis/Los Angeles
Volvo Tennis/Los Angeles
Volvo Tennis/Los Angeles